Horace Allen may refer to:
 Horace Allen (baseball) (1899–1981), outfielder in Major League Baseball
 Horace G. Allen (1855–1919), American lawyer and politician
 Horace Newton Allen (1858–1932), American missionary and diplomat